Alexis Hart (born May 23, 1998) is an American volleyball player. She plays as opposite for MTV Stuttgart.

Career 
She played for University of Minnesota. She was named to the All-Tournament Team, at the 2019 NCAA Division I women's volleyball tournament.

She played for LP Kangasala. She transferred to Rote Raben Vilsbiburg. She played for Allianz MTV Stuttgart.

References

External links 

 Alexis Hart - Player Info Global Sports Archive

1998 births
American women's volleyball players
Living people
Minnesota Golden Gophers women's volleyball players